Ali El Haggar (born on 4 April 1954 in Imbaba, Giza), he is an Egyptian singer, artist, composer, and actor.

Collaborations
El-Haggar works with famous composers and lyricists as well as with other singers in duets whenever possible. "In duets I like to deal with talented singers; as competing with clever singers motivates me to explore my capabilities to execute the song in the best distinguished manner". During his career El-Haggar has performed a number of duets with singers such as his career companion Mohammed El-Helw, in songs such as "Beladi" and "Khan El-Anadeel" (the opening and closing of a TV serial carrying the same name), with Hanan Mady in many television serial songs like "El-Likaa El-Tany & El-Mal we El-Banoon", with Angham in the play "Rosasa Fi El Qalb", and with Hoda Ammar in "Bent we Walad" from the movie Eskendereyya New York.

Another important phase in El-Haggar's professional life was his first collaboration with his brother, the composer and singer Ahmed El-Haggar. This was in 1978 when Ahmed El-Haggar composed his brother's hit "Ozoriny". The success that this song achieved sparked El-Haggar's singing career. The El-Haggar brothers have co-operated in many other songs, Ahmed El-Haggar as composer and Ali El-Haggar as lyricist. Among these songs are: "Bahebek", "Ana Biki Ya Samra Akon", "El-Ahlam", "Kont Faker", "Tesaaliny", "Lama El-Sheta Edo’o El-Biban", "Ma Tekdebish", "Ergaaily", "Lessa El-Kalam", and recently "Ya Masria".

Awards
El-Haggar was awarded a prize of honor in the 15th Arabic Music Festival for the year 2006 as well as two prizes from two different European theatre festivals in both Germany and Italy. He also received "Best Singer of the Year" in a Sharm El-Sheikh video clip festival for his song "El-Leil Ya Nas".

Works

Albums
 Ala ad ma Habaina
 Kont fain ya Ali (for children)
 Robaeyat "Salah Jaheen"
 Mehtajlek
 Ozoreeni
 El Ahlam
 Matsadaqish
 Fi Alb El Lail
 Ana kont Eidek
 Zay El Hawa
 Lem El Shaml
 Tegeesh Naeesh
 Rama Remsho
 Lessa El Kalam
 Risha
 Yamama
 Maktobali
 Es-ha Ya Nayer

Television themes
 Al Ayaam
 El Shahd Wa El Domooa
 Ala Abwab El Madina
 Wa Qal Al Bahr
 Al Mashrabeyya
 Abdullah Al Nadim
 El lel W Akhro
 Haroon El Rashid
 Omar Ebn Abdel Aziz
 Mohammad Rasool Allah
 Wajaa Al Baad
 Al sira Al Helaleyya
 Hadaek Al Shaytan
 Zeaab El Gabal
 Al Mal wal Banoun
 Al Leqaa Al Thani

Television series – singing and acting
 Yaseen we Baheyya
 Abul El Ela Elbeshry
 Al Baqy men Al zaman sa3a
 Al wakf
 Resala khatera
 Bawabat El Halawani
 Al Awda
 Robaeyyat Salah Jaheen

Movies
 Al Meghnawati
 Anyab
 Al Fata Al Shereer

Plays
 Laila men alf laila
 Zabaaen Gohannam
 Nawwar Al Khair
 Welad El Shawarea
 Menain ageeb nas
 Eyal Teganen
 Atnain fi offa
 Alahomma Egaalo khair
 Rosasa Fi Al Qalb
 Khayef Aqool Elly Fi Qalby
 Yamama Beida

References

1954 births
Living people
Egyptian male film actors
20th-century Egyptian male singers
21st-century Egyptian male singers
Egyptian male television actors
Egyptian male stage actors